Franz von Paula Schrank (21 August 1747, in Vornbach – 22 December 1835) was a German priest, botanist and entomologist.

He was ordained as a priest in Vienna in 1784, gaining his doctorate in theology two years later. In 1786 he was named chair of mathematics and physics at the lyceum in Amberg, and in 1784 became a professor of botany and zoology at the University of Ingolstadt (later removed to Landshut). Schrank was the first director of the botanical gardens in Munich from 1809 to 1832.

Schrank was the first author to use the genus name Triops, which he used in his work on the fauna of Bavaria in 1803.

Works
 Beiträge zur Naturgeschichte (Augsburg, 1776)
 Vorlesungen über die Art die Naturgeschichte zu studieren (Ratisbohn, 1780)
 Enumeratio insectorum Austriæ indigenorum (Wien, 1781)
 Anleitung die Naturgeschichte zu studieren (München, 1783)
 Naturhistorische Briefe über Österreich, Salzburg, Passau und Berchtesgaden with Karl Maria Erenbert Freiherr von Moll, Salzburg, 1784–1785)
 Anfangsgründe der Botanik (München, 1785)
 Baiersche Reise … (1786)
 Verzeichnis der bisher hinlänglich bekannten Eingeweidewürmer, nebst einer Abhandlungen über ihre Anverwandschaften (München, 1787)
 Bayerische Flora (München, 1789)
 Primitiæ floræ salisburgensis, cum dissertatione prævia de discrimine plantarum ab animalibus (Frankfurt, 1792)
 Abhandlungen einer Privatgesellschaft vom Naturforschern und Ökonomen in Oberteutschland (München, 1792)
 Anfangsgründe der Bergwerkskunde (Ingolstadt, 1793)
 Reise nach den südlichen Gebirgen von Bayern, in Hinsicht auf botanische und ökonomische Gegenstände (München, 1793)
 Fauna Boica Vol 3 (Nürnberg, 1803)
 Flora monacensis (München, 1811–1820)
 Plantæ rariores horti academici Monacensis descriptæ et iconibus illustratæ (1819)
 Sammlung von Zierpflanzen (1819)
 Entomologische Beobachtungen Naturforscher Stück 24, 60–90. (1789)
Enumeratio insectorum Austriae indigenorum Francisci de Paula Schrank. Augustae Vindelicorum : Klett et Franck, 1781. 548 pp. (1781) (checklist) 
Sammlung naturhistorischer und physikalischer Aufsäze,hrsg. von Franz von Paula Schrank. Nürnberg, Raspe, 1796.xvi, 456 p. 7 plates (part fold.) online

See also
 :Category:Taxa named by Franz von Paula Schrank
 List of Roman Catholic scientist-clerics

References

External links

 Entry in the Catholic Encyclopedia
 BDHL Digitised Beiträge zur Naturgeschichte
 BDHL Digitised Enumeratio insectorum Austriae indigenorum
  BDHL Digitised Sammlung naturhistorischer und physikalischer Aufsäze, hrsg. von Franz von Paula Schrank.
 BDHL Digitised Naturhistorische Briefe über Oestreich, Salzburg, Passau und Berchtesgaden, von Franz von Paula Schrank und Karl Ehrenbert Ritter von Moll.

1747 births
1835 deaths
Botanists with author abbreviations
Bryologists
18th-century German botanists
German entomologists
German mycologists
German phycologists
Pteridologists
Academic staff of the Ludwig Maximilian University of Munich
People from Passau (district)
Catholic clergy scientists
Academic staff of the University of Ingolstadt
19th-century German botanists